Arpke is a village in the town of Lehrte in the district of Hanover, in Lower Saxony, Germany. It is situated approximately 30 km east of Hanover.

Since 1893 Arpke has a railway station on the Berlin–Lehrte railway and is connected once per hour to Hanover and Wolfsburg.

Literature 
 Frank Henschel: Arpke. Chronik eines Dorfes (Stadtgeschichtliche Hefte der Stadt Lehrte, Band 17), Stadt Lehrte (Hg.), 7/2000, 208 Seiten mit Abbildungen, broschiert
 Heimatbund Arpke (Hg.): Arpke. Nicht nur historische Ansichten eines niedersächsischen Dorfes. Festschrift zum 40jährigen Bestehen des Heimatbundes Arpke, 2005, broschiert, 62 Seiten mit Abbildungen in Schwarz-weiß

External links 

 Website about Arpke

Villages in Lower Saxony